The Autopista A4, also known as Autopista Este-Oeste or Autopista Nacional Este-Oeste, is a Cuban motorway linking Havana to Pinar del Río. Along with the Autopista A1 (Autopista Nacional), partly built, that will link Havana to Guantánamo, it is classified as part of the whole Autopista Nacional route, spanning the length of the island; as the Carretera Central highway.

History
The motorway, connected to the A1 via the Havana Beltway (A2), was opened on December 19, 1989.

Route
The A4 is a dual carriageway with 6 lanes from Havana to Guanajay, 4 lanes from Guanajay to Pinar del Río, and has some at-grade intersections with rural roads. From Guanajay it is a beltway (Autopista ZEDM) linking the A4 to the Port of Mariel.

See also

Roads in Cuba
Transport in Cuba
Infrastructure of Cuba

References

External links

A4
Transport in Havana
Artemisa Province
Pinar del Río Province